Stojan Stojkov (born 1941 in Podaresh, Radovish), is a Macedonian composer and pedagogue. He completed his education on music at Belgrade Music Academy, where he graduated on the Department of Composition. Stojkov is author of numerous works of almost all genres and forms of music. His creative opus includes symphonies, vocal-instrumental, vocal, and staged works, chamber compositions, works for children and other kinds of music creative works.

Work
The essence of the Macedonian music folklore is the basis of his creative preoccupation. He transfers the folklore into an entirely new quality, at the same time giving it a new dimension of universality. Characteristic for his creative works is that he doesn't use just any folklore idiom, but the one of the rustic singing, which offers enormous opportunities for specific harmonic treatments through multi-layer accord sounding and polyphonic conducting of the structure. Stojkov doesn't focus on one stylistic region. He is in a continuous search for new sounds and soundings, which arouse from the way of using the selection of folk and classical instruments.

He is member of several international organizations and forums, giving huge contribution to the development and the affirmation of the Macedonian music culture. His compositions have been performed in over 20 countries, among which are all Balkan and European countries, USA, Canada, Russia and others, and everywhere they attracted particular interest. Famous domestic and foreign choruses have Stojkov's compositions on their permanent repertoire, and often won awards on international level. All this distinguishes him as one of the most productive and recognizable Macedonian composers, affirmed locally and internationally. Most of his creative works are published on sound carriers.

Professor Stojkov has won several awards and expert recommendations for his social and professional work, among which is the Macedonian highest state award "11 October". Today Stojan Stojkov is full-time professor on the Faculty of Music Art in Skopje, Republic of Macedonia.

As a representative of the music life in Macedonia participates in various international projects, forums and organizations in Macedonia and abroad. 

He is typical neo-folklorist representative in Macedonia. His works are directly inspired by native folklore music tradition being genuine sample of autochthonous transformation of folklore idiom in various formal structures as chamber, orchestral, and vocal music works. This unique composing style reflects in his active pedagogy activity.

Performances

Macedonia, Bulgaria, Albania, Greece, Turkey, Romania, Yugoslavia, Hungary, Croatia, USA, France, Germany, Italy, Sweden, Belgium, Canada, England and other countries.

Awards

 "Pance Pesev" award for the composition "Mother Holy", 1985

For state and professional engagement the awards:

 YRT composition "Suite for string orchestra"
 "13th November" for the "Suite for string orchestra" and music achievements in 1987
 Macedonian Republic Culture Association
 Order for achievements with silver star

Orchestral music

 Symphonic overture (1968),
 Andante for chamber orchestra (1970),
 Concert Music - for string orchestra and percussion (1975),
 Concerto - for cello and orchestra (1983),
 Symphonic Image (1985),
 Suite - for string orchestra (1986)
 I – suite for string orchestra, 1997
 Enlightenment – for symphonic orchestra, 1999

Vocal - instrumental

 Ad libidum I – for female choir and chamber orchestra on folk text, 1987
 Ad libidum II – for female choir, two drums and four kavals, 1988
 Cantata Mirror - for children, female and male choir, orchestra, narrators and vocal soloists (1991)
 Young Goce, Young Vojvoda and Seni se, Goro – for choir, soloist and chamber orchestra on folk text, 1993
 Rakatka – for mixed choir and big folk orchestra on folk text, 1996
 Sumerian scripts – for two sopranos and string orchestra, on the poetry by Mihail Rendjov and Frederiko Garcia Llorka
 Five music vignettes – for soprano, violin and piano, on the poetry by Mihail Rendjov, 1999
 Three songs – for mezzo-soprano and symphonic orchestra

Voice and orchestra

-	Letter - for mezzo-soprano and chamber orchestra (1974),
-	Oath - suite for high voice, female choir, chamber orchestra and percussion 1974)
 Cycle songs- for mezzo-soprano and symphonic orchestra (1984),
 Holy Mother for voice, narrators, electronics and string orchestra on the text Zvonko Stojanovic and on folk text (1985)
 Thoughts - for mezzo-soprano, /kaval/ Macedonian brass instrument, tambura /Macedonian string instrument/, tapan/ Macedonian percussion instrument/ piano, synthesizer

Chamber music

 Composition for piano, 1961
 Three miniatures for violin and piano, 1962
 Suite for basson and piano (1962),
 Suite for piano, 1962
 Trio for bassoon, clarinet and piano (1963),
 Nocturne for violin and piano (1963),
 Intermezzo for piano (1963),
 Rondo dramatico for clarinet and piano (1964),
 Scherzo for piano, 1964
 Variation for piano, 1964
 Sonata for piano, 1965
 String quartet (1967),
 Sonata for oboe and piano (1974),
 Prelude for flute and piano (1978),
 Three Pieces for flute and piano (1979),
 Pastoral suite for piano, 1979
 Baroque suite for flute, viola da gamba and cembalo, 1980
 Impression for double bass and piano (1981),
 Composition No. 1 Pastorala for trombone and piano, 1980
 Sonatinna for violin and piano, 1981
 Elegy for double bass and piano, 1981
 Baroque suite for double bass and piano, 1981
 Introduction for flute and piano, 1981
 Wind octet, 1985
 Wind quintet (1985)
 Sonata for piano No. 2, 1985
 Composition for solo flute, 1988
 Sonata for violoncello and piano, 1988 – 89
 Sonata for flute and piano, 1989
 Trio for oboe, clarinet and piano, 1996
 Preludium and Coral for trumpet and organ, 1997

Choir

Mixed choir:

 Madrigal – text I. Mensetic, (1963),
 Karaorman (1963),
 Flowers –text Slavko Janevski, (1973),
 Farewell –text Koco Racin, (1973),
 Eyes –text Aco Sopov, (1974),
 My White-lake Mother Homeland-text Tome Bogdanovski, (1976),
 A Hero Departed native text, (1977),
 A farewell song –native text, (1984),
 "A note" – text by Mihail Rendjov, 1987
 "Hym for St. Kliment" – liturgical text

Female choir:

 Rural suite –native text (1973),
 Vocals (1979),
 Dew Drops (1981),
 St. Ilija Day Fire - text Tome Bogdanovski, (1984),
 Festive Song (1986),
 Triptych  – text Ante Popovski, (1987),
 Sonatina – text Gane Todorovski, (1987),
 Ad libidum – native text, 1987
 Farewell song (1991)
 Diptych – native text, 1993

Children's choir:

The tenderness of happy tomorrow –text Aco Karamanov, (1973), 
"Two rural songs" –text native, 1974
"May song" for children's choir and piano-text Gligor Popovski, (1977), 
"Festive song about Mite and Stiv" for children's choir and mandolin orchestra, 1987
"This Country", 1989
Hymn for St. Kliment of Ohrid (1991)

Songs:

 Birth –for soprano and piano (1963),
 Sunset – for soprano and piano –text by Mateja Matevski (1970),
 Roads  - for deep voice and piano - text by Mateja Matevski (1971),
 Preludium for high voice and piano (1974),
 Nerezi for voice and piano (1986)
 "And never", "Love" – for soprano and piano –text by Aco Karamanov
Mandolin orchestra
-	"Nocturne" – 1980
-	"Suite" – 1985
-	"Spring flower", (to my daughter), 1986
-	"The Prilep fight", 1988
-	"Kales Angja", 1988

Music for scene
-	"Spring tale" –musical for children for soloists, narrators, two children choirs, piano and orpharion instruments –text by Vanco Nikolevski, 1983
-	"The Princess Drop" –music for children play by Video Podgorec, 1976
-	"Sleep, my little one" and "Kitten" –text by Bistrica Mirkuloska, 1975
-	"A song" –text by Stojan Tarapuza, 1976
-	"When the armies sing" –text by Tome Bogdanovski
-	"Butterfly" –text by Bistrica Mirkuleska, 1981
-	"Breakfast" –text by Bistrica Mirkuleska, 1981
-	"Our army" text by Rajko Jovcevski, 1981
-	"Lullaby" text by Bistrica Mirkuleska, 1981

Children songs
-	"Little star" –text by Nenad Dzambazov, 1971
-	"Little bee" –text by Tome Bogdanovski, 1972
 Squirrel–text by Tome Bogdanovski (1973),
 "Sleep, my little one" and "Kitten" –text by Bistrica Mirkuloska, 1975
 "Song" –text by Stojan Tarapuza, 1976
 "When Lice sings" –text by Tome Bogdanovski, 1977
"Butterfly" and "Breakfast" –text by Bistrica Mirkuleska, 1981
-	"Our army" text by Rajko Jovcevski, 1981
-	"Lullaby" text by Bistrica Mirkuleska, 1981

References

Living people
1941 births
Macedonian composers
Male composers